Rohrbach (Saar) station is a station in the district of Rohrbach of Sankt Ingbert in the German state of Saarland.

History

The station was opened on 1 September 1895 with the building of the line to bypass the Hasseler Tunnel. Its importance increased with the opening on 1 May 1904 of the Glan Valley Railway strategic railway, linking Munster am Stein and Homburg, along with a new section of the Palatine Ludwig Railway between Homburg to Rohrbach, which was opened on 1 January 1904. Extensive modifications to the station building were made in 1958. In preparation for the operation of the ICE 3 train service between Mannheim and Paris in 2008, the western exit curve was eased and the station platform was raised and moved about 50 metres further east. The station building was closed after a long period when no ticket had been sold there.

Until the closure of numerous factories along the railway line in Rohrbach, there was a freight yard and a number of factory sidings, the last of which was closed in 2008. In addition to the three passenger platform tracks, there are two platform tracks under construction.

Infrastructure
In the area of the station there are no services apart from ticket machines. The railway line,  which runs approximately east-west, has a pedestrian tunnel under it, but the connection to the platform is provided by a separate tunnel, which, however, connects only towards the centre of the town, which is to the north, so rail passengers exiting to the south must cross the tracks and climb steps twice.

Rail services
Rohrbach station is served by the following lines:

Notes

Railway stations in the Saarland
Sankt Ingbert
Buildings and structures in Saarpfalz-Kreis
Railway stations in Germany opened in 1895